{{Infobox college basketball team
|current = 2022–23 Evansville Purple Aces men's basketball team
|name = Evansville Purple Aces
|logo = Evansville Athletics logo.svg
|logo_size = 200
|university = University of Evansville
|conference = Missouri Valley
|location = Evansville, Indiana
|coach = David Ragland
|tenure = 1st
|arena = Ford Center
|capacity = 10,000
|nickname = Purple Aces
|h_pattern_b=_thinsidesonwhite
|h_pattern_s=_blanksides2
|h_body= 470A68
|h_shorts= 470A68
|a_pattern_b=_thinorangesides_2
|a_pattern_s=_orangesides
|a_body= 470A68
|a_shorts= 470A68
|3_pattern_b=_thinpurplesides
|3_pattern_s=_purplesides
|3_body= ED8B00
|3_shorts= ED8B00
|NCAAchampion = 1959*, 1960*, 1964*, 1965*, 1971*
|NCAAfinalfour = 1958*, 1959*, 1960*, 1964*, 1965*, 1971*
|NCAAeliteeight = 1958*, 1959*, 1960*, 1963*, 1964*, 1965*, 1968*, 1971*
|NCAAsweetsixteen = 1957*, 1958*, 1959*, 1960*, 1962*, 1963*, 1964*, 1965*, 1966*, 1968*, 1971*, 1972*, 1976*
|NCAAsecondround =  1989
|NCAAtourneys = 1957*, 1958*, 1959*, 1960*, 1961*, 1962*, 1963*, 1964*, 1965*, 1966*, 1968*, 1971*, 1972*, 1974*, 1976*, 1982, 1989, 1992, 1993, 1999*at Division II level
|conference_tournament = Midwestern Collegiate Conference1982, 1992, 1993
| conference_season = Midwestern Collegiate Conference1982, 1987, 1989, 1992, 1993

Missouri Valley Conference1999''
}}

The Evansville Purple Aces men's basketball''' team represents the Purple Aces of the University of Evansville, located in Evansville, Indiana, in NCAA Division I basketball competition. They play their home games at the Ford Center. Evansville's athletics teams were originally known as the Pioneers in the early part of the 1900s. In the 1920s, the name Aces arose after a local sports writer wrote in a game story of the men's basketball team, "They played like Aces." The team has been known as the Aces and/or Purple Aces ever since. Evansville has won five Division II national championships (1959, 1960, 1962, 1964, 1965, 1971).  On November 12, 2019, the Aces earned one of the biggest victories in their Division I history, upsetting top-ranked Kentucky at Rupp Arena.

History

In the early years of the men's basketball program the Purple Aces appeared in the NAIA national tournament. The Purple Aces appeared 4 times in the NAIA Tournament (1941, 1942, 1951, and 1955). The Purple Aces had a NAIA tournament record of 3–4. The furthest Evansville got in the NAIA tournaments was in third round (NAIA Quarterfinals) in 1951, only to lose to Regis University (Colo.) 70–68.  

Shortly after the 1955 season the Purple Aces would move up to the NCAA College Division, now called NCAA Division II. The Evansville Purple Aces rank second all-time in NCAA College Division national championships with five: 1959, 1960, 1964, 1965 (29–0 record) and 1971. The 1964 and 1965 teams starred NBA Legend Jerry Sloan, the 1971 team featured future NBA star Don Buse and future NCAA referee Steve Welmer.

In 1977, UE began playing in NCAA Division I athletics. That same year on December 13, a chartered DC-3 carrying the entire UE basketball team crashed in a field near the Evansville Regional Airport en route to a game against Middle Tennessee State. Every member of the team and coaching staff on the plane was killed. David Furr, who was a member of the 1977–78 Purple Aces squad, did not die in the crash, as he was out for the season with an ankle injury and thus was not on the plane that day. However, only just two weeks later after the crash, Furr and his younger brother Byron were killed in a car accident near Newton, Illinois, leaving the entire 1977–78 Purple Aces team dead.

Tremendous community support brought back the basketball program the next year. Evansville was a charter member of the Midwest Collegiate Conference, now known as the Horizon League. The Aces won or shared the MCC regular season title in 1982, 1987, 1989, 1992, and 1993. They also won the conference tournament title in 1982, 1992, and 1993. The Aces are now a member of the Missouri Valley Conference, and won the 1999 regular season title. 

Legendary Aces coach Arad McCutchan was the first NCAA College Division coach selected to the Naismith Basketball Hall of Fame.

The Purple Aces have made five trips to the NCAA Men's basketball tournament (1982, 1989, 1992, 1993, 1999)  and two trips to the NIT (1988, 1994).

Seasonal records

Postseason results

Division I NCAA tournament results

The Purple Aces have appeared in five NCAA Division I Tournaments. Their combined record is 1–5.

Division II NCAA tournament results
The Purple Aces have appeared in 14 NCAA Division II Tournaments. Their combined record is 39–9. They are five time national champions (1959, 1960, 1964, 1965, 1971).

NAIA tournament results

The Purple Aces have appeared in four NAIA Division I Tournaments. Their combined record is 3–4.

NIT results

The Purple Aces have appeared in two National Invitation Tournaments (NIT). Their combined record is 1–2.

CBI results

The Purple Aces have appeared in two College Basketball Invitationals (CBI). Their combined record is 1–2.

CIT results
The Purple Aces have appeared in three CollegeInsider.com Postseason Tournaments (CIT). Their combined record is 8–2. They were CIT champions in 2015

Retired/honored jerseys
Twelve players and two coaches have had their jerseys retired by the school. Nevertheless, numbers remain active and can be worn by future players.

References

External links